The Warehouse Theatre is a  student-run theatre company located on the Stephens College campus in Columbia, Missouri, U.S. As a women's college, Stephens has historically admitted a very limited number of males as students in the School of Creative and Performing Arts Theatre and Dance programs. The theater typically does four shows per year, two per semester.

Mission statement

”The Warehouse fosters freedom of material and vision by producing original scripts, avant-garde pieces, and socially poignant works which, more often than not, highlight women’s issues and experiences.”

The Warehouse Board
There are usually 11 members on the Warehouse board. These members are in charge of different aspects of the company. As a whole, they make important decisions about the Warehouse season, including choosing the shows, and also plan and organize events, such as fundraisers or open mic nights. While the first year, second year, and conservatory representatives are elected at the beginning of the new academic year, the other board members are elected at the middle of the second semester of the previous year.

Events 
In addition to putting on four shows, the Warehouse hosts numerous events throughout the year.

Warehouse Dance 
Generally at the end and/or beginning of the school year the Warehouse will host a themed dance for all to enjoy.

Open Mic Night 
One Wednesday every month, the Warehouse hosts an open mic night. These open mic nights are designed as a way to give Stephens students an outlet to express themselves and entertain others. Students can dance, sing, perform, do stand-up, read poetry or do whatever they want. Students of all majors are encouraged to come and show off what they can do.

Play-in-a-Day 
Starting in February 2012 the Warehouse hosted a 24-Play Festival. Students wrote, directed, memorized, designed, and performed an hour of 10-minute plays, all in 24 hours. In 2019, this was scheduled to be replaced with the first-ever Short Play Festival but was canceled due to COVID-19.

Past events 
The Warehouse had a few traditions that have not been passed on in recent years, but up until then had been annual. Some are as follows.

Musical revue 
In the past, the Warehouse presented a musical revue every year. The revue is entirely musically directed, choreographed and performed by students. In 2009, the revue was entitled Bombs Away: A Musical Revue of Flops and in 2008, it was called De-Briefing: A Night of Women Singing Some of Musical Theatre's Most Popular Songs for Men.

Shows

External links 
Stephens College Theater Department
Warehouse Theatre Company Website

Stephens College
Theatre companies in Missouri
University and college theatres in the United States
Tourist attractions in Columbia, Missouri
Theatres in Columbia, Missouri